HMS Tradewind was a British submarine of the third group of the T class. She was built as P329 at Chatham, and launched on 11 December 1942.   she is the only ship of the Royal Navy to have been named Tradewind, after the trade winds.

Second World War service
She spent most of her wartime career operating against the Japanese in the Far East, attacking enemy shipping and laying mines.  She sank nine Japanese sailing vessels, and two small unidentified Japanese vessels, a Japanese tug and the Japanese merchant tanker Takasago Maru.  The Japanese merchant cargo vessel Kyokko Maru was sunk after hitting a mine laid by Tradewind.

Her most infamous sinking was of the Japanese army cargo ship Junyō Maru which was headed for Sumatra, on 18 September 1944.  Unbeknown to the Commanding Officer of Tradewind, Lt.Cdr. Lynch Maydon, the Japanese ship was carrying 4,200 Javanese slave labourers and 2,300 Allied prisoners of war from Batavia to Padang. 5,620 people died in the sinking.

Post-war service
Tradewind survived the war and was modified in July 1945-September 1946 to become an acoustic trials submarine, and used for tests. The modifications included the removal of external torpedo tubes and guns, the bridge was faired, the hull streamlined and some internal torpedo tubes blanked over.  Measurements made using Tradewind were used to overhaul several of the T class boats to increase their ability to act stealthily against Soviet submarines and surface ships.

In 1953 she took part in the Fleet Review to celebrate the Coronation of Queen Elizabeth II. She was scrapped at Charlestown on 14 December 1955.

References

Publications

External links
 http://www.royalnavy.mod.uk/server/show/nav.2558 

 

British T-class submarines of the Royal Navy
Ships built in Barrow-in-Furness
1942 ships
World War II submarines of the United Kingdom
Cold War submarines of the United Kingdom
Royal Navy ship names